At the Bardo may refer to:
 Near-East museums:
 Bardo National Museum (Tunis), in suburbs of Le Bardo, Tunisia 
 The Bardo National Museum of Prehistory and Ethnography, former palace a.k.a. Bardo National Museum (Algiers)
 "Lincoln at the Bardo", recurring misnomer for Lincoln in the Bardo, 2017 experimental novel referring to Tibetan Buddhist afterlife